The 2019 Chengdu Open was a men's tennis tournament played on outdoor hard courts. It was the 4th edition of the Chengdu Open and part of the ATP Tour 250 series of the 2019 ATP Tour. It took place at the Sichuan International Tennis Center in Chengdu, China, from September 23 to 29.

Singles main-draw entrants

Seeds

 1 Rankings are as of September 16, 2019

Other entrants
The following players received wildcards into the singles main draw:
  Bai Yan
  Chung Hyeon
  Li Zhe

The following player received entry using a protected ranking into the singles main draw:
  Vasek Pospisil

The following player received entry as a special exempt:
  Egor Gerasimov

The following players received entry from the qualifying draw:
  Jason Jung
  Bradley Klahn
  Kamil Majchrzak
  Alexei Popyrin

The following player received entry as a lucky loser:
  Lloyd Harris

Withdrawals
  Richard Gasquet → replaced by  Vasek Pospisil
  Mikhail Kukushkin → replaced by  Ričardas Berankis
  Kamil Majchrzak → replaced by  Lloyd Harris
  Reilly Opelka → replaced by  Alexander Bublik
  Sam Querrey → replaced by  Márton Fucsovics

Doubles main-draw entrants

Seeds

 Rankings are as of September 16, 2019

Other entrants
The following pairs received wildcards into the doubles main draw:
  Li Zhe /  Gao Xin
  Sun Fajing /  Wang Aoran

Champions

Singles

  Pablo Carreño Busta def.  Alexander Bublik, 6–7(5–7), 6–4, 7–6(7–3)

Doubles

   Nikola Ćaćić /  Dušan Lajović def.  Jonathan Erlich /  Fabrice Martin, 7–6(11–9), 3–6, [10–3]

External links
 

Chengdu Open
Chengdu Open
Chengdu Open
Chengdu Open